{{DISPLAYTITLE:C28H40O4}}
The molecular formula C28H40O4 (molar mass: 440.615 g/mol, exact mass: 440.2927 u) may refer to:

 Megestrol caproate (MGC)
 Pentagestrone acetate (PGA)

Molecular formulas